Aphantorhaphopsis verralli is a Palearctic species of fly in the family Tachinidae.

Distribution
United Kingdom, Sweden, Russia.

References

Tachininae
Muscomorph flies of Europe
Insects described in 1928